Villar de Corneja is a municipality located in the province of Ávila, Castile and León, Spain. According to the 2003 census (INE), the municipality had a population of 86.

References

Municipalities in the Province of Ávila